Alex Strohl (born 5 September 1989) is a French photographer and author, best known for his landscape and outdoor photography. Strohl is based in Whitefish, Montana. In 2018, XXLPIX ranked him in 12th position in the "TOP100 photographers on the web" list (highest new entry). He authored a book named Alternative Living, published by Blurb in 2015.

His works has been featured in publications and magazines such as Forbes, BuzzFeed, Vanity Fair, and Gentleman's Journal.

Bibliography 
 Alternative Living (2015)

Further reading

References

External links
 Official website
 Interview: Exploring Peace and Nature with Adventure Photographer Alex Strohl
 Your First Look at Photographer Alex Strohl's Brand-New Book

Travel photographers
French photographers
People from Madrid
1989 births
Living people